Devillier is a surname. Notable people with the surname include:

 Justin Devillier, American chef
 Phillip DeVillier (born 1976), American politician

See also
 De Villiers, a similar surname

French toponymic surnames